Sir Charles Moihi Te Arawaka Bennett   (27 July 1913 – 26 November 1998) was a New Zealand broadcaster, military leader, public servant, and high commissioner to the Federation of Malaya (1959–1963). Of Māori descent, he identified with the Ngati Pikiao and Ngati Whakaue iwi.

Early life
Bennett was born in Rotorua, New Zealand on 27 July 1913, one of 19 children of Frederick Augustus Bennett of Ngati Whakaue of Te Arawa, who became first Anglican Māori bishop of Aotearoa, and his second wife, Arihia Ngarangioue (Rangioue) Hemana (or Pokiha).

From the age of six months to thirteen years Charles was raised by his grandparents at Maketu. He won a scholarship to Te Aute College, where he was a distinguished student, head prefect and footballer. He obtained a BA in 1936 from Canterbury University College.

World War II

Greece and Crete
Charles Bennett joined the 28th (Maori) Battalion at the outbreak of war in 1939. He underwent officer training at Trentham Military Camp, embarking overseas in May 1940 as a second lieutenant in B Company. On Lieutenant-Colonel George Dittmer's staff he fought in Greece and Crete. He led an intelligence unit responsible for reconnaissance, speaking on the radio in Maori. In November 1941 Bennett was promoted to captain.

North Africa

By October 1942 Bennett was a major commanding B Company. Early in November his two superiors were wounded in fighting near Tel el Aqqaqir, and Bennett then commanded the Māori Battalion, being promoted lieutenant-colonel (the youngest battalion commander in the Second New Zealand Expeditionary Force).

In March 1943 at Tebaga Gap, Tunisia, Bennett ordered a successful attack on Point 209 (Hikurangi to the Māori) which resulted in Lieutenant Te Moananui-a-Kiwa Ngarimu being awarded a posthumous VC, and Bennett the DSO.

In April, during the fighting at Takrouna and Djebel Berda, Bennett was severely wounded by a mine and was invalided home. His recovery took three years, and left him lame.

Post-war

With Major-General Howard Kippenberger Bennett worked on the Māori Battalion's history with the War History Branch of the Department of Internal Affairs. He became an interpreter at Internal Affairs.

On 10 October 1947, in Wellington, Bennett married Elizabeth May Richardson (née Steward). They had no children, but he regarded her two children as his own.

Bennett won a University of Oxford scholarship from the Ngarimu VC and 28th (Māori) Battalion Memorial Scholarship Fund to read for a doctorate on the problems of cultural adjustment of the Māori people. Although the thesis was not completed, in January 1959 he became New Zealand's high commissioner to the Federation of Malaya (later Malaysia). In 1963, he was made an honorary Commander of the Order of the Defender of the Realm by the Malay government.

Bennett was president of the Labour Party from 1973 to 1976, and stood for Labour in the Rotorua electorate in the 1969 general election.

Bennett was awarded an honorary doctorate (LL.D.) from the University of Canterbury in 1973. In the 1975 Queen's Birthday Honours, he was appointed a Knight Bachelor, for public services, especially to the Māori people, and in 1990 he received the New Zealand 1990 Commemoration Medal. He was a patron of the Electoral Reform Coalition.

Bennett died in Tauranga on 26 November 1998. He was survived by his wife and her two children. During the tangihanga, the traditional Māori funeral rite, the New Zealand Defence Force announced that their crest will be changed from the traditional two crossed swords to a sword crossed with a taiaha, the traditional Māori weapon, in Bennett's honour.

Honours 

 Reception of Distinguished Service Order (DSO) (1943)

 Honorary Commander of the Order of the Defender of the Realm (P.M.N. (K)) – Tan Sri (1963)

References

1913 births
1998 deaths
New Zealand public servants
Ngāti Pikiao people
Ngāti Whakaue people
New Zealand military personnel
New Zealand Māori soldiers
People from Rotorua
New Zealand Māori public servants
New Zealand Māori broadcasters
New Zealand Army officers
New Zealand military personnel of World War II
New Zealand Labour Party politicians
High Commissioners of New Zealand to Malaysia
Unsuccessful candidates in the 1969 New Zealand general election
New Zealand Knights Bachelor
People educated at Te Aute College
New Zealand Companions of the Distinguished Service Order
University of Canterbury alumni
People from Maketu